Palmerston is a cat who was the resident Chief Mouser of the Foreign & Commonwealth Office (FCO) at Whitehall in London. He is a black-and-white bicolour cat and began his role in the position of Chief Mouser on 13 April 2016. Previously, he was from Battersea Dogs & Cats Home and is named after the former Foreign Secretary and Prime Minister Lord Palmerston.  He was employed at the King Charles Street building.

The inception of the position of Chief Mouser at the FCO followed from the position Chief Mouser to the Cabinet Office, Larry and from visits from George Osborne's cat Freya who made regular visits to the office.

Palmerston was in the news on 3 May 2016, as it was reported that he had caught his first mouse. On 11 July 2016, Palmerston was caught on camera in a stand-off between himself and Larry in and around Downing Street. On 26 July 2016, Palmerston was caught sneaking into Number 10, when the black door was left open. He was later evicted by resident police. On 1 August 2016, a journalist caught Palmerston and Larry having a serious cat-fight, which led to Palmerston having damage to his ear and Larry losing his collar.

In October 2017, Palmerston "appointed" his first overseas envoys. Lawrence of Abdoun, a rescued black-and-white street tomcat, was given a role at the British Embassy in Amman, Jordan and is named after British military officer T. E. Lawrence and the neighbourhood in Amman where the embassy is located. Leyla Pixie, an orphaned kitten from Turkey, was adopted by the British Consulate General in Istanbul.

On 7 August 2020, Palmerston "retired" as the FCO's Chief Mouser, moving to the countryside to "spend more time relaxing away from the limelight"; his "resignation" was announced on Twitter.

See also 
 Chief Mouser to the Cabinet Office
 Gladstone (cat), Chief Mouser to HM Treasury since 2016
 List of individual cats

References

External links 
 Palmerston's official twitter feed (@DiploMog) 
 Cat starts work at Foreign office

2014 animal births
Foreign, Commonwealth and Development Office
Individual cats in England
Individual cats in politics
Male mammals
Working cats